The  was held on 6 February 2022. The awards were announced on 4 December 2021.

Awards
 Best Film: - Intolerance
 Best Director: Keisuke Yoshida - Intolerance and Blue
 Yoshimitsu Morita Memorial Best New Director: Yūjirō Harumoto - A Balance
 Best Screenplay: Keisuke Yoshida - Intolerance and Blue
 Best Cinematographer: Norimichi Kasamatsu - Under the Open Sky
 Best Actor:
 Arata Furuta - Intolerance
 Tori Matsuzaka - Intolerance, Last of the Wolves and In Those Days
 Best Actress: Machiko Ono - A Madder Red
 Best Supporting Actor: Ryohei Suzuki - Last of the Wolves
 Best Supporting Actress:
 Tōko Miura - Drive My Car
 Yuki Katayama - A Madder Red
 Best Newcomer:
 Nao - Eternally Younger Than Those Idiots, The Sound of Grass and My Daddy
 Seina Nakata - Over the Town, In Those Days and A Girl on the Shore
 Yuumi Kawai - A Balance and It’s a Summer Film
 Seiichi Kohinata - It’s a Summer Film and Eternally Younger Than Those Idiots
 Examiner Special Award:: Mitsunobu Kawamura and Star Sands CO.,Ltd.

Top 10
 Intolerance
 Under the Open Sky
 Drive My Car
 Aristocrats
 A Balance
 A Madder Red
 We Made a Beautiful Bouquet
 Over the Town
 Last of the Wolves
 One Summer Story
runner-up. In the Wake

References

Yokohama Film Festival
Yokohama Film Festival
2022 in Japanese cinema
2021 film awards